Jørgen Ib Olsen (9 November 1929 – 9 November 2009) was a Danish rower who competed in the 1948 Summer Olympics.

He was born in Højelse, Køge Municipality. In 1948 he was the coxswain of the Danish boat that won the bronze medal in the coxed four event.

References

External links
 Ib Olsen's grave 

1929 births
2009 deaths
Danish male rowers
Coxswains (rowing)
Olympic rowers of Denmark
Rowers at the 1948 Summer Olympics
Olympic bronze medalists for Denmark
Medalists at the 1948 Summer Olympics
People from Køge Municipality
Sportspeople from Region Zealand